Jamaat-e-Islami is an Islamic movement founded in 1941 in British India and was a political party till 1947 following partition of India by the Islamic author, theorist, and socio-political philosopher, Syed Abul Ala Maududi.

Along with the Muslim Brotherhood, founded in 1928, Jamaat-e-Islami was one of the original and most influential Islamist organisations, and the first of its kind to develop an ideology based on the modern revolutionary conception of Islam. This movement still has a significant legacy.

The group split into separate independent organisations in India, Pakistan and Bangladesh following the Partition of India in 1947. Other groups related to or inspired by Jamaat-e-Islami developed in Kashmir, Britain, and Afghanistan (see below). The Jamaat-e-Islami parties maintain ties internationally with other Muslim groups.

Islam is the ideology of the Jamaat-e-Islami. Its structure is based on its belief on the three-fold concept of the Oneness and sovereignty of God (Monotheism), the Concept of Prophethood and the Concept of Life after Death. From these fundamentals of belief follow the concepts of unity of all mankind, the purposefulness of man's life, and the universality of the way of life taught by the Muhammed.

It was the first organised Islamic reformist movement in the Indian subcontinent formed on 26 August 1941 in Lahore under the leadership of Syed Abul Ala Maududi, the Jamaat Addressed all Indians regardless of caste and creed. It appeals to all sections of humanity to eschew the path of violence and mutual hatred, terrorism and oppression, and to settle down to the task of building a Righteous Society on stable and abiding foundations. From its very inception it advocated the cause of the Righteous Way, the way of peace and abiding well-being. It recalls to the Indian mind the message and teachings of all apostles, prophets and divine messengers.

The Jamaat believes that Islam and Muslims have a special commitment to building a peaceful and prosperous world, a world where there is no material exploitation, no division of human life into separate material and spiritual domains, and where divine values hold good in all walks of life. A world where religion is no tool for hegemonisation, but is a way of life that is holistic and profoundly positive.

Maududi was the creator and leader of Jamaat-e-Islami, which opposed the partition of India and the creation of Pakistan, actively working to prevent it. Though he opposed the creation of Pakistan fearing the liberalism of its founders and the British-trained administrators, when it happened, he viewed it as a gradual step to the Islamization of its laws and constitution even though he had earlier condemned the Muslim League for the same approach. After the partition of India, the organisation became the spearhead of the movement to transform Pakistan from a Muslim homeland into an Islamic state. Madudi, like the traditionalist ulama, believed in the six canonical hadiths and the Quran, and also accepted much of the four schools of fiqh. His efforts focused on transforming to a "theo-democracy" based on the Sharia which would enforce things like abolition of interest-bearing banks, sexual separation, veiling of women, hadd penalties for theft, adultery, and other crimes. The promotion of Islamic state by Maududi and Jamaat-e Islami had broad popular support.

Maududi believed politics was "an integral, inseparable part of the Islamic faith". Islamic ideology and non-Islamic ideologies (such as capitalism and socialism, liberalism or secularism) were mutually exclusive. The creation of an Islamic state would be not only be an act of piety but would be a cure for all of the many (seemingly non-religious) social and economic problems that Muslims faced. Those working for an Islamic state would not stop at India or Pakistan but would effect a sweeping revolution among mankind, and control all aspects of the world's life.

History
Maududi opposed British rule but also opposed both the anti-colonialist Muslim nationalist Muslim League's proposal for a separate Muslim state led by Muhammad Ali Jinnah, and the composite nationalism (muttahida qaumiyyat) idea of Jam'iyyat al-Ulama-ye Hind and Deobandi scholar Maulana Sayyid Hussain Ahmad Madani for a united independent India with separate institutional structures for Hindus and Muslims.

At the time of the Indian independence movement, Maududi and the Jamaat-e-Isami actively worked to oppose the partition of India. Maududi argued that the division of India violated the Islamic doctrine of the ummah and believed that the partition would separate Muslims by a temporal boundary. As such, before the partition of colonial India happened, the Jamaat-e-Islami actively worked to prevent it. Its Pakistan branch would actively oppose the split between East and West Pakistan and the creation of Bangladesh.

In his view Muslims were not one religious or communal group among many working to advance their social and economic interests, but a group "based upon principles and upon a theory" or ideology. A "righteous" party (or community) that had "a clearly defined ideology, allegiance to a single leader, obedience, and discipline", would be able to transform the whole of India into Dar al-Islam. Unlike fascists and communists, once in power an Islamic state would not be oppressive or tyrannical, but instead just and benevolent to all, because its ideology was based on God's commands.

In 1940, the Muslim League met in Lahore and passed the Lahore Resolution, calling for autonomous states in the Muslim majority areas of India. Maududi believed the nationalism in any form was un-Islamic, concerned with mundane interests of people and not Islam. In response he launched his own party, Jamaat-e-Islami, founded on 26 August 1941, at Islamia Park, Lahore. Seventy-five people attended the first meeting and became the first 75 members of the movement.

Maududi saw his group as a vanguard of Islamic revolution following the footsteps of early Muslims who gathered in Medina to found the first "Islamic state". Members uttered the Shahada, the traditional statement of conversion to Islam, when they joined, implying to some that Jama'ati felt they had been less-than-true Muslims before joining. Jamaat-e-Islami was and is strictly and hierarchically organised in a pyramid-like structure. All supporters work toward the common goal of establishing an ideological Islamic society, particularly through educational and social work, under the leadership of the emir. Being a vanguard party, not all supporters could be members, only the elite. Below members were/are "affiliates", and "sympathizers" beneath them. The party leader is called an ameer (commander).
 
Maududi sought to educate the elite of the Muslim community in the principles of Islam and correct "their erroneous ways of thinking" both because he believed societies were influenced from the top down.

During the years before the partition of India, Jamaat-e-Islami stood aloof from the intense political fights of the time in India, concentrating on "training and organising" and refining and strengthening the structure of Jamaat-e-Islami.

Groups associated with Jamaat-e-Islami
 Jamaat-e-Islami Pakistan, based in Pakistan. In 1947, Jamaat-e-Islami moved its operations to West-Pakistan after Independence.
 Jamaat-e-Islami Hind, based in India. Founded by Jamaat-e-Islami Members who remained in India after 1947 independence. 
 Jamaat-e-Islami Kashmir, in the Indian state of Jammu and Kashmir. It was formed in 1953 after the pro-plebiscite prime minister of Jammu and Kashmir was arrested by the Indian government.
 Jamaat-e-Islami AJK, in the Pakistan-administered Kashmir (Azad Jammu and Kashmir), established in 1974.
 Bangladesh Jamaat-e-Islami, based in Bangladesh, legalized in 1975 under the military regime. Later declared de facto illegal by the High Court Division of the Supreme Court of Bangladesh in 2018 for abetting the Pakistan Armed Forces perpetrating the genocide in Bangladesh at 1971. 

 Jamiat-e Islami, based in Afghanistan. Founded in 1972 by Burhanuddin Rabbani, it was also said to be inspired by Abul A'la Maududi and the Jamaat-e-Islami party. Predominantly ethnically Tajik, the group was a major player in the "Peshawar Seven" during the jihad against Soviet military in the 1980s.
 Hezbi Islami, also based in Afghanistan, broke away from Jamiat-e Islami in 1975–1976. Led by Gulbuddin Hekmatyar, its ethnic make-up was overwhelmingly Ghilzai Pashtun. It's less moderate stance won it the backing of Jamaat-e-Islami Pakistan (and Saudi Arabia and Pakistan president Zia ul-Haq) during the jihad against the Soviet military. 
 UK Islamic Mission was founded by members of the East London Mosque in 1962. Also "inspired by the Jamaat-e-Islami party in Pakistan" and the "Islamic revivalist teachings of Abul A'la Maududi and others."
 Supporters of Jammat-e Islami also have groups in other states. According to The Columbia World Dictionary of Islamism, Jamaat-e-Islami branches have followed Pakistani immigration to South Africa and Mauritius as well as the UK.

See also

 Qutbism
 Political Islam
 Takfir wal-Hijra
 Islamic schools and branches

References 

 
Islamic political parties in Pakistan
Islamist groups
Islamist political parties in India